Amaramkavu is a sacred grove and Hindu temple dedicated to Goddess VanaDurga, situated in Kolani, Thodupuzha Municipality, Idukki district, Kerala. Amaramkavu is the largest sacred grove in Idukki district. Amaramkavu has an area near to 3 acres and is rich in biodiversity.

External links
 www.amaramkavu.in
 www.keralatemplenet.com

Durga temples
Hindu temples in Idukki district